The First National Bank is a historic bank building in Mobile, Alabama.  It was built in 1905 to the designs of local architectural firm Watkins, Hutchisson, and Garvin.  The two-story masonry structure is in the Classical Revival style and features a brick and terracotta facade.  It was placed on the National Register of Historic Places on November 17, 1978.

References

Bank buildings on the National Register of Historic Places in Alabama
National Register of Historic Places in Mobile, Alabama
Buildings and structures in Mobile, Alabama
Neoclassical architecture in Alabama
Commercial buildings completed in 1905
1905 establishments in Alabama